Syed Mir Hassan was an Indian Sunni scholar of the Qur'an, Hadith, Sufism, and the Arabic language. He was a professor of Arabic at Scotch Mission College in Sialkot and was awarded the title of Shams al-’Ulama’ ("Sun of the Scholars") by the British Crown. Mir Hassan is best known as the teacher of the philosopher-poet Muhammad Iqbal and the poet Faiz Ahmad Faiz. He was also the paternal uncle of the Pakistani journalist Syed Nazeer Niazi and was affiliated with Sir Syed Ahmed Khan's rationalist school of Islamic modernism.

Early life
Born on 18 April 1844. Mir Hassan belonged to a religious family of Eastern physicians but did not opt for that profession, and he also refused to take up a career as a traditional prayer leader because he did not want to live on charity. Much to the horror of his family he ended up teaching at a vernacular school run by Christian missionaries. At the age of nineteen he also visited Delhi to meet the famous poet Mirza Ghalib.

Syed Mir Hassan and Syed Ahmed Khan
He was a great admirer of Sir Syed Ahmed Khan, of whom he became a staunch supporter. He had regular correspondence with him, and had the opportunity to meet him in person on numerous occasions. He was a regular visitor of All India Muhammadan Educational Conference. When Sir Syed Ahmed Khan visited Punjab, Syed Mir Hassan was the first to receive him. He used all his influence to spread Aligarh movement in his area.

Syed Mir Hassan and Sir Muhammad Iqbal
He had a great influence on Sir Muhammad Iqbal. Syed Mir Hasan was "an accomplished scholar with a knowledge of several Islamic languages. Mir Hassan gave Sir Muhammad Iqbal a thorough training in the rich Islamic literary tradition and influence him deeply. It is said that once Iqbal picked up Maulvi Mir Hasan’s shoes as a mark of respect."

Title of Shams al-’Ulama’ (“Sun of Scholars”)
In 1922, when the British governor of the Punjab proposed to the British Crown that Iqbal be knighted in recognition of his literary achievements, Iqbal asked that Mir Hasan should be awarded a title. When the governor remarked that Mir Hassan had not written any books, Iqbal replied that he, Iqbal, was the book Mir Hasan had produced. Mir Hasan received the title of Shams al-’Ulama’ (“Sun of Scholars”).

See also
 Sir Syed Ahmed Khan
 Syed Nazeer Niazi
 Sir Muhammad Iqbal
 All India Muhammadan Educational Conference

References

Sources
 Iqbal, an illustrated biography, by Khurram Ali Shafiq.
 Danai Raz, by Syed Nazeer Niazi
 Iqbal Kay Hazoor, by Syed Nazeer Niazi
 Zinda Rud, by Justice Javid Iqbal
 Tulip in the Desert: a selection of the poetry of Muhammad Iqbal by Sir Muhammad Iqbal, Mustansir Mir.

Muhammad Iqbal
Leaders of the Pakistan Movement
19th-century Muslim scholars of Islam
Islamic philosophers
People from Sialkot
1929 deaths
1844 births